Ronald Lawrence Abrams (born April 27, 1952) is an American politician in the state of Minnesota. He served in the Minnesota House of Representatives from 1989–2002 and 2003–2006.

References

1952 births
Living people
University of Minnesota alumni
Harvard Law School alumni
Republican Party members of the Minnesota House of Representatives